Zhelnino is a rural locality (a village) in Chernovskoye Rural Settlement, Bolshesosnovsky District, Perm Krai, Russia. The population was 44 as of 2010. It has one street.

Geography 
Zhelnino is located on the Sosnova River, 28 km south of Bolshaya Sosnova (the district's administrative centre) by road. Lykovo is the nearest rural locality.

References 

Rural localities in Bolshesosnovsky District